Carl W. Ernst (born September 8, 1950, in Los Angeles, California) is the William R. Kenan, Jr., Distinguished Professor Emeritus  of Islamic studies at the Department of Religious Studies at the University of North Carolina at Chapel Hill. He was also the founding director (2003-2022) of the UNC Center for Islamic and Middle East Studies.

Life
Ernst received his A.B. in comparative religion at Stanford University in 1973, and his Ph.D. at Harvard University in 1981. He taught at Pomona College from 1981 to 1992. He was a professor at the University of North Carolina at Chapel Hill from 1992 to 2022.

It was his suggestion that set in motion the UNC-Qur'an Controversy in 2002, when UNC's Summer Reading Program required incoming students to read  .

Awards and Honors
Ernst's  book, Following Muhammad: Rethinking Islam in the Contemporary World (UNC Press, 2003),

received several international awards, including the 2004 Bashrahil Prize for Outstanding Cultural Achievement.
His book Ruzbihan Baqli: Mysticism and the Rhetoric of Sainthood in Persian Sufism won the Farabi Award. His translation from the Arabic, Hallaj: Poems of a Sufi Martyr, was supported by a John Simon Guggenheim Memorial Foundation Fellowship, and it was the first recipient  (2017) of the  Global Humanities Translation Prize from the Buffett Institute at Northwestern University.

Ernst has received several Fulbright fellowships (India, 1978-9; Pakistan, 1986; Spain, 2001; Malaysia, 2005), plus grants from the National Endowment for the Humanities, and he is a Fellow of the American Academy of Arts and Sciences. He has also been a visiting professor at the Ecole des Hautes Etudes en Sciences Sociales (1990, 2003, 2019, 2022).

Bibliography 
 Refractions of Islam in India: Situating Sufism and Yoga, SAGE Publications India. (2016) 
 Islamophobia in America The Anatomy of Intolerance, Palgrave Macmillan (2013, editor) 
How to Read the Qur'an: A New Guide, with Select Translations, University of North Carolina Press. (2011) 
Following Muhammad Sallallahu 'alaihi Wa Salam: Rethinking Islam in the Contemporary World, University of North Carolina Press. (2003) 
Sufi Martyrs of Love: Chishti Order in South Asia and Beyond (co-authored with Bruce Lawrence) (2002) 
Teachings of Sufism (1999) 
A translation of The Unveiling of Secrets: Diary of a Sufi Master by Ruzbihan Baqli (1997) 
The Shambhala Guide to Sufism (1997) 
Ruzbihan Baqli: Mysticism and the Rhetoric of Sainthood in Persian Sufism (1996) 
Eternal Garden: Mysticism, History, and Politics at a South Asian Sufi Center (1993) 
Words of Ecstasy in Sufism (1985)

References

External links 
 Carl Ernst's web page
 Audio recording of a talk by Carl Ernst given at the University of Chicago.

Living people
American Islamic studies scholars
Stanford University alumni
1950 births
Harvard University alumni
University of North Carolina at Chapel Hill faculty
Place of birth missing (living people)
Pomona College faculty
Distinguished professors in the United States